Nomotettix is a genus of pygmy grasshoppers in the family Tetrigidae. There are at least three described species in Nomotettix.

Species
These three species belong to the genus Nomotettix:
 Nomotettix cristatus (Scudder, 1863) (crested pygmy grasshopper)
 Nomotettix parvus Morse, 1895 (low-ridged pygmy grasshopper)
 Nomotettix saussurei Bolívar, 1909

References

Further reading

 

Tetrigidae
Articles created by Qbugbot